Nils Dunkel (born 20 February 1997) is a German artistic gymnast who represented Germany at the 2020 Summer Olympics.

Career 
Dunkel began gymnastics since his father, Stephan Dunkel, is a coach at the MTV Erfurt club. He competed at the 2014 Junior European Championships and finished twenty-first in the all-around final. He finished fourth in the pommel horse event final. He represented Germany at the 2014 Summer Youth Olympics and finished twelfth in the all-around final.

Dunkel competed at the 2018 European Championships and helped the German team finish fourth. Individually, he finished fourth in the parallel bars event final. He was not able to compete at the 2019 World Championships due to a foot injury.

Dunkel was selected to represent Germany at the 2020 Summer Olympics alongside Lukas Dauser, Philipp Herder, and Andreas Toba.

References

External links

 
 

1997 births
Living people
German male artistic gymnasts
Gymnasts at the 2014 Summer Youth Olympics
Sportspeople from Erfurt
Gymnasts at the 2020 Summer Olympics
Olympic gymnasts of Germany
21st-century German people